The 2023 World Wheelchair Curling Championship was held from March 4 to 12 at the Richmond Curling Centre in Richmond, British Columbia, Canada. The event was held in conjunction with the 2023 World Wheelchair Mixed Doubles Curling Championship.

Qualification
The following nations qualified to participate in the 2023 World Wheelchair Curling Championship:

Teams
The teams are listed as follows:

Round robin standings
Final Round Robin Standings

Round robin results
All draws times are listed in Pacific Time (UTC−08:00).

Draw 1
Saturday, March 4, 12:00 pm

Draw 2
Saturday, March 4, 7:00 pm

Draw 3
Sunday, March 5, 12:00 pm

Draw 4
Sunday, March 5, 7:00 pm

Draw 5
Monday, March 6, 12:30 pm

Draw 6
Monday, March 6, 8:00 pm

Draw 7
Tuesday, March 7, 12:30 pm

Draw 8
Tuesday, March 7, 8:00 pm

Draw 9
Wednesday, March 8, 12:30 pm

Draw 10
Wednesday, March 8, 8:00 pm

Draw 11
Thursday, March 9, 1:00 pm

Playoffs

Qualification Games
Friday, March 10, 1:00 pm

Semifinals
Saturday, March 11, 2:00 pm

Bronze medal game
Sunday, March 12, 10:00 am

Final
Sunday, March 12, 10:00 am

Final standings

See also
2022 World Wheelchair-B Curling Championship
2023 World Wheelchair Mixed Doubles Curling Championship

References

External links

World Wheelchair Curling Championship
World Wheelchair Curling Championship
World Wheelchair Curling Championship
World Wheelchair Curling Championship
World Wheelchair Curling Championship
World Wheelchair Curling Championship